N. Ganapathy may also refer to:

 N. Ganapathy (Thanjavur), Indian politician from Thanjavur district, Tamil Nadu, India
 N. Ganapathy (Viluppuram), Indian politician from Viluppuram district, Tamil Nadu, India